Thierry Retoa (born 21 November 1971) is a Gabonese footballer. He played in eight matches for the Gabon national football team from 1993 to 1995. He was also named in Gabon's squad for the 1994 African Cup of Nations tournament.

References

External links
 

1971 births
Living people
Gabonese footballers
Gabon international footballers
1994 African Cup of Nations players
Place of birth missing (living people)
Association football defenders
21st-century Gabonese people